The 1985–86 Coppa Italia, the 39th Coppa Italia was an Italian Football Federation domestic cup competition won by Roma.

Group stage

Group 1

Group 2

Group 3

Group 4

Group 5

Group 6

Group 7

Group 8

Knockout stage 

1Awarded to Sampdoria for fans troubles during extra times

Final

First leg

Second leg

Roma won 3–2 on aggregate.

Top goalscorers

References 

 Official site
 Bracket

Coppa Italia seasons
Coppa Italia
Coppa Italia